Barium oxide, also known as baria, is a white hygroscopic non-flammable compound with the formula BaO. It has a cubic structure and is used in cathode ray tubes, crown glass, and catalysts. It is harmful to human skin and if swallowed in large quantity causes irritation. Excessive quantities of barium oxide may lead to death.

It is prepared by heating barium carbonate with coke, carbon black or tar or by thermal decomposition of barium nitrate.

Uses
Barium oxide is used as a coating for hot cathodes, for example, those in cathode ray tubes. It replaced lead(II) oxide in the production of certain kinds of glass such as optical crown glass. While lead oxide raised the refractive index, it also raised the dispersive power, which barium oxide does not alter. Barium oxide also has use as an ethoxylation catalyst in the reaction of ethylene oxide and alcohols, which takes place between 150 and 200 °C.

It is also a source of pure oxygen through heat fluctuation. It readily oxidises to BaO2 by formation of a peroxide ion. The complete peroxidation of BaO to BaO2 occurs at moderate temperatures but the increased entropy of the O2 molecule at high temperatures means that BaO2 decomposes to O2 and BaO at 1175K.
The reaction was used as a large scale method to produce oxygen before air separation became the dominant method in the beginning of the 20th century. The method was named the Brin process, after its inventors.

Preparation
Barium oxide is made by heating barium carbonate at temperatures between 1000-1450 °C.  It may also be prepared by thermal decomposition of barium nitrate. Likewise, it is often formed through the decomposition of other barium salts.
 2Ba + O2 → 2BaO
 BaCO3 → BaO + CO2

Safety issues
Barium oxide is an irritant. If it contacts the skin or the eyes or is inhaled it causes pain and redness. However, it is more dangerous when ingested. It can cause nausea and diarrhea, muscle paralysis, cardiac arrhythmia, and can cause death. If ingested, medical attention should be sought immediately.

Barium oxide should not be released environmentally; it is harmful to aquatic organisms.

See also

References

External links
International Chemical Safety Card 0778

Barium compounds
Oxides
Rock salt crystal structure